The Limyra bilingual inscription is a 4th-century BCE bilingual Greek-Aramaic funerary inscription discovered in 1840. It was found 3km outside Limyra, in southwest Turkey.

The one line inscription is 142cm long, with a 79cm long gap.

The Aramaic inscription is known as KAI 262. An analysis of the inscription was first published in 1887 by Eduard Sachau.

Bibliography
 Hanson, R. (1968). Aramaic Funerary and Boundary Inscriptions from Asia Minor. Bulletin of the American Schools of Oriental Research, (192), 3-11. doi:10.2307/1356398
 Lipinski, Edward, 1975, Studies in Aramaic Inscriptions and Onomastics I, OLA 1, Leuven : 162-171.
 Fellows, C., An Account of Discoveries in Lycia, Being a Journal Kept During a Second Excursion in Asia Minor, . London: J. Murray, 1841
 Sachau, E., "Eine altaramäische Inschrift aus Lycien." SKAWW 114 (1887): 3–7, pl. 1
 Darmesteter, J., "L'inscription araméenne de Limyra." JA 8/12 (1888): 508–10
 Perles, F., "Das Land Arzâph (IV Ezra 13, 45)." AfO 3 (1926): 120–21.

References

Aramaic inscriptions
Archaeological artifacts
Greek inscriptions
4th-century BC works
19th-century archaeological discoveries
KAI inscriptions